The 1925–26 season was the thirty-first season in which Dundee competed at a Scottish national level, playing in Division One, where they would finish in 10th place under new manager Alec McNair. Dundee would also compete in the Scottish Cup, where they would be knocked out by Aberdeen in the 2nd round. For one season only, the Dee would wear a unique home jersey with a large white semicircle around the collar.

Scottish Division One 

Statistics provided by Dee Archive.

League table

Scottish Cup 

Statistics provided by Dee Archive.

Player Statistics 
Statistics provided by Dee Archive

|}

See also 

 List of Dundee F.C. seasons

References

External links 

 1925-26 Dundee season on Fitbastats

Dundee F.C. seasons
Dundee